The Stephen S. Chang Award for Lipid or Flavor Science has been awarded every year since 1993. It is awarded to a member of the Institute of Food Technologists (IFT) who has made significant contributions to lipid or flavor science. This award is named for Stephen S. Chang (1918-1996), a Chinese-born food scientist who later became a food science professor at Rutgers University in New Brunswick, New Jersey specializing in lipid and flavor research. It was the second IFT award to be named for a living person.

Award winners receive a USD 3000 honorarium and a Steuben crystal from the Stephen S. Chang Endowment Fund supported by the Taiwan Food Industries (SSC).

Winners

References

List of past winners - Official site

Food technology awards